Andy Pembélé (born 4 July 2000) is a French professional footballer who plays as a forward for  club Rodez, on loan from Paris FC.

Career
On 16 September 2020, Pembélé signed a professional contract with Paris FC. He made his professional debut with Paris FC in a 3–0 Ligue 2 win over Le Havre on 3 October 2020.

On 19 July 2021, Pembélé moved to Créteil on a season-long loan. On 18 August 2022, he was loaned to Rodez.

Personal life
Born in France, Pembélé is of DR Congolese descent.

References

External links
 
 LOSC Profile

2000 births
Living people
People from Gonesse
French footballers
French sportspeople of Democratic Republic of the Congo descent
Association football forwards
Stade Malherbe Caen players
Lille OSC players
Paris FC players
US Créteil-Lusitanos players
Rodez AF players
Ligue 2 players
Championnat National players
Championnat National 2 players
Championnat National 3 players
Footballers from Val-d'Oise
Black French sportspeople